These are the results of the Women's 800 metres event at the 1997 World Championships in Athletics in Athens, Greece. The event took place on the 6th, 7th and 9th of August.

Doping disqualification
Lyubov Tsyoma tested positive for the anabolic steroid stanozolol after the semifinals and was disqualified.

Medalists

Results

Heats
First 2 of each Heat (Q) and the next 6 fastest (q) qualified for the semifinals.

Semifinals
First 4 of each Semifinal qualified directly (Q) for the final.

Final

References

 Results
 IAAF

- Women's 800 Metres
800 metres at the World Athletics Championships
1997 in women's athletics